The State Poet of New York is the poet laureate for the U.S. state of New York. The position of New York State Poet was established by a special mandate of the New York State Legislature on August 1, 1985. In 1988 New York also established position for other genres of writing entitled New York State Author. In 2016 Governor Cuomo also named Joseph Tusiani Poet Laureate Emeritus.

List of Poets Laureate
 Stanley Kunitz (1987-1989)
 Robert Creeley (1989-1991)
 Audre Lorde (1991-1993)
 Richard Howard (1993-1995)
 Jane Cooper (1995-1997)
 Sharon Olds (1998-2000)
 John Ashbery (2001-2003)
 Billy Collins (2004-2006)
 Jean Valentine (2008-2010)
 Marie Howe (2012-2014)
 Yusef Komunyakaa (2015-2017)
 Alicia Ostriker (2018-2021)
 Willie Perdomo (2020-present)

List of State Authors
 Grace Paley (1986-1988)
 E. L. Doctorow (1989-1991)
 Norman Mailer (1991-1993)
 William Gaddis (1993-1995)
 Peter Matthiessen (1995-1997)
 James Salter (1998-2000)
 Kurt Vonnegut (2001-2003)
 Russell Banks (2004-2008)
 Mary Gordon (2008-2010)
 Alison Lurie (2012-2014)
 Edmund White (2014-2016)
 Colson Whitehead (2018-2021)
 Ayad Akhtar (2021-2023)

References

 
New York (state) culture